The Discussion of Women's Poetry List-serv, known as WOM-PO or WOMPO, is an international listserv devoted to the discussion of poetry by women. WOM-PO was started in December 1997 by poet Annie Finch.  The listserv is currently housed at Nassau Community College, New York, United States, with the majority of members from the United States, the U.K. Australia, and New Zealand.  Discussion on the listserv has sparked numerous conference panels, poetry readings, poetic collaborations,  spin-off listservs such as the Mom-Po list, journal publications such as a collaborative Crown of sonnets published in Prairie Schooner in 2007, and an anthology, Letters to the World: Poems from the Wom-Po Listserv, published in 2008 by Red Hen Press.

History
In a 2016 interview, Finch describes the founding of WOM-PO as a response to the silencing of women on other poetry listservs, Contemporary American Poetry List and POETICS list, in 1997.  Finch says that "on December 18 I got so desperate that, pretty much on the spur of the moment, I got permission to use the Miami University server and started WOM-PO with an email to a few friends . . . and some women I didn’t know but had noticed trying in vain to have their intelligent comments heard on the male-dominated listservs." The first 10 subscribers were Wendy Battin, Catherine Daly, Marilyn Hacker, Rachel Loden, Gwyn McVay, Marilyn Nelson, Judith Roitman, Susan Schultz, Kathrine Varnes, and Elizabeth Waldner.  Finch was a "very active, very hands on facilitator during the formative years of building the culture of the listserv, for probably the first five or six years."   One early challenge was the question of whether to allow men on the listserv, which was settled, after extensive discussion, through consensus with a "yes." Finch asked poet Amy King to take over in 2008.

Members
Some notable members of Wom-Po have included poets Sandra Beasley, Margo Berdeshevsky, Chana Bloch, Allison Hedge Coke, Martha Collins,  Sharon Doubiago, Annie Finch, Ann Fisher-Wirth, Daisy Fried, Kate Gale, Daniela Gioseffi, Arielle Greenberg, Gabriel Gudding, R. S. Gwynn, Allison Joseph, Marilyn Hacker, Farideh Hassanzadeh, Eloise Klein Healy, Julie Kane, Amy King, Ursula K. Le Guin, Jeffrey Levine, Marilyn Nelson, Mendi Obadike, Alicia Ostriker, Katha Pollitt, Molly Peacock, Mira Rosenthal, Metta Sama, Rati Saxena, Susan M. Schultz, Peggy Shumaker, Evie Shockley, Ron Silliman, Patricia Smith, Stephanie Strickland, Lesley Wheeler, and Rachel Zucker.

Culture
Wom-Po is a close community with distinctive longstanding traditions such as referring to members playfully as "womponies" and an annual Friday breakfast at the Associated Writers Program conference.  Several volunteer-run weekly newsletters keep the list free of self-promotional and congratulatory posts so that discussion can focus on poetry.

References

External links
 List Archives at Nassau Community College
 Letters to the World at Red Hen Press
 Interview with Annie Finch by Zara Raab
 Review of Letters to the World by Sandra Mullen at Junctures
 Interview with Annie Finch by Frances Donovan
Poetry organizations
Organizations for women writers